Joseph Samson (1888–1957) was a French church composer and choirmaster at the Dijon Cathedral. His books on church music include Musique et Vie intérieure and A l'ombre de la Cathédrale enchantée (1929).

Recordings
Samson: La Cathédrale enchantée La Maitrise de Dijon, Etienne Meyer  2017

References

1888 births
1957 deaths